Tahmursabad (also Romanized as Ţahmūrs̱ābād; also known as Ţahmāsebābād) is a village in Dastjerd Rural District, Alamut-e Gharbi District, Qazvin County, Qazvin Province, Iran. At the 2006 census, its population was 50, in 13 families.

References 

Populated places in Qazvin County